Ai 葉 is the Mandarin/Taiwanese pinyin and Wade–Giles romanization of the Chinese surname  in Chinese character definition of leaf.  It is listed 334th in the Song dynasty classic text Hundred Family Surnames. As of 2008, it is the 215th mostly common surname in Taiwan, shared by 400,000 people.

Notable people
Ai Nanying (艾南英; 1583–1646), Ming dynasty essayist
Ai Nengqi (艾能奇; died 1647), rebel general and adopted son of Zhang Xianzhong
Ai Yuanzheng (艾元征; 1624–1676), Qing dynasty Minister of Justice
 Ai Ai (艾靉; 1906–1982), Republic of China lieutenant general, Deputy Minister of Defense
Ai Qing (艾青; 1910–1996), pen name of poet Jiang Zhenghan
Ai Siqi (艾思奇; 1910–1966), pen name of Mongol-Chinese philosopher Li Shengxuan
Ai Xia (艾霞; 1912–1934), silent film actress
Ai Xing (艾兴; 1924–2008), mechanical engineer, academician of the Chinese Academy of Engineering
Ai Zhisheng (艾知生; 1928–1997), Minister of Broadcast, Film, and Television
Ai Weiren (艾维仁; 1932–2018), PLA lieutenant general
Sarah Allan (艾兰; born 1945), American paleographer and sinologist
Ai Xuan (艾軒; born 1947), artist, son of Ai Qing
Ai Husheng (艾虎生; born 1951), PLA lieutenant general
Ai Xiaoming (艾晓明; born 1953), writer and director
Ai Wei (艾伟; born 1955), Taiwanese actor
Ai Weiwei (艾未未; born 1957), artist, son of Ai Qing
Ai Baojun (艾宝俊; born 1960), former vice mayor of Shanghai
Randy Ai (艾雷迪; 1969–2013), Taiwanese cartoonist
Ai Jing (艾敬; born 1969), singer and painter
Ai Jingjing (艾晶晶; born 1978), writer
Ai Zhibo (艾志波; born 1982), football player
Ai Mengmeng (艾梦萌; born 1983), singer
Eve Ai (艾怡良; born 1987), Taiwanese singer
Ai Fei (艾菲; born 1987), singer
Gloria Ai (艾诚; born 1987), bilingual business anchorwoman

References

Chinese-language surnames
Individual Chinese surnames